Kim Dong-beom (born January 26, 1991) is a South Korean actor. Kim made his acting debut in 2007, and has appeared in mostly bit parts and supporting roles. His major roles have been in Jungle Fish 2 (2010) and Kong's Family (2013).

Filmography

Film

Television series

References

External links 
 
 
 
 
 

1991 births
Living people
South Korean male film actors
South Korean male television actors